"What It Comes Down To" is a song by The Isley Brothers, who released it in late 1973 as a follow-up to the group's crossover pop hit, "That Lady, Pt. 1 & 2".

Song information
Both songs were featured on the group's Epic debut, 3 + 3. It features a synthesizer keyboard solo from Chris Jasper, Ernie Isley on guitar and Ronald Isley on lead vocals. The b-side of the song was the ballad "The Highways of My Life".

Charts
The song peaked at number 55 on the Billboard Hot 100 and was a top five hit on the R&B singles chart where it peaked at number 5.

Personnel
Ronald Isley – lead vocals
Ronald Isley, Rudolph Isley and O'Kelly Isley Jr. – backing vocals
Ernie Isley – guitars, percussion, backing vocals
Marvin Isley – bass guitar, backing vocals
Chris Jasper – electric piano, clavinet, ARP synthesizer, backing vocals
Truman Thomas – Hammond organ
George Moreland – drums

External links

1973 singles
The Isley Brothers songs
T-Neck Records singles